The Laois-Offaly rivalry is a Gaelic football rivalry between Irish county teams Laois and Offaly, who first played each other in 1903. It is considered to be one of the biggest local rivalries in Gaelic games. Laois's home ground is O'Moore Park and Offaly's home ground is O'Connor Park.

While both teams are regarded as minnows within the Leinster Senior Football Championship, they have enjoyed some success winning seven provincial titles between them. (?? Offaly have won 10 Leinster titles...)

All-time results

Legend

Senior

References

Offaly
Offaly county football team rivalries